Javier Tarancón (born 23 November 1991) is a Spanish racing driver who has raced in karting, Formula BMW and Formula Renault. His career began in 2000 at the age of 8.

Career

Karting
In 2000, Tarancón finished 10th in the Catalonia Karting Championship but won the Social Vendrell Karting Championship. In 2001, he again took the title in Social Vendrell Karting and finished 3rd in three other competitions: the Championship Catalonia, Toyota Open and the Race of Champions (as a cadet). In 2002, Tarancón was 2nd in Social Vendrell Karting but 5th in the Race of Champions and in 2003 finished 4th in the Spanish Karting Trophy.

Tarancón raced with Yamaha in 2004, gaining a 2nd place in the Spanish championships and in the Catalonia championships one victory, 11 second places and 2 third places. In 2005, he took part in four different championships, including the European Junior Championship and the Spanish Karting Championship. He finished 6th in the Junior Champions race and 4th in the Industria Karting Trophy. 2006 saw Tarancón finish 26th after taking part in 1 race in the Andrea Margutti trophy, and finished 3rd in the August Martins trophy. He was also 7th in the Open Masters Italia and won the Spanish Karting Championship.

In 2007, Tarancón was runner-up in the WSK Internacional Series and 3rd in the European Championship of KF2 as well as 3rd in the Asia Pacific Championship in Japan.

In 2008, he joined the Autosport Academy and his results were as follows:
 3rd and 6th at Ledenon, France
 3rd at Pau, France
 3rd at Magny-Cours, France
 3rd and 2nd at the Circuit de Spa-Francorchamps, Belgium
 7th and 4th at the Masaryk Circuit, Brno, Czech Republic
 7th at Le Mans, France
 3rd at Snetterton

Formula racing
In 2009 Tarancón moved on to the Formula BMW Championship in Europe and finished the championship in 12th place overall after scoring 92 points, racing at tracks such as Barcelona, Budapest, Monza and winning at Spa. For 2010, he was a guest driver in the Eurocup Formula Renault Series at the last rounds, contesting at Hockenheim, Silverstone and Catalunya.

In 2011 Tarancón contested a full season in Eurocup Formula Renault, finishing in 8th place. At the first race in Alcaniz, he failed to finish before taking 6th. At Spa he was 10th and 7th, taking the fastest lap in the latter, at the Nurburgring he finished 9th before retiring, in Hungary he had a pair of 5th places before a disappointing Silverstone weekend, 14th and retiring. At Paul Ricard he scored only 3 points.

At his home race, the final, at Catalunya he took his first victory, sharing the podium with Carlos Sainz Jr and Daniil Kvyat.

In 2012 Tarancón contested the Formula Renault 2.0 Championship.

References

External links
 

1991 births
Living people
Spanish racing drivers
People from Barcelona
Formula Renault 2.0 NEC drivers
Formula Renault Eurocup drivers
RC Formula drivers
Epsilon Euskadi drivers
Tech 1 Racing drivers
Auto Sport Academy drivers
DAMS drivers
Formula BMW Europe drivers